Heywood railway station serves the town of Heywood in Greater Manchester, England. The original station was opened in 1841 (by the Manchester and Leeds Railway). It was resited in 1848 when the line was extended to Bury. It closed on 5 October 1970. It re-opened on 6 September 2003 as an extension of the East Lancashire Railway from Bury Bolton Street.  The boundary between the ELR and the national rail network is located a short distance east of the station, at Hopwood.

£300 million had been pledged to link Heywood back to the National Rail Network in 2009, which would have seen services direct to Manchester via Castleton, but this scheme was subsequently shelved due to lack of funding.  The ELR still has ambitions to run trains through to Castleton though to allow direct interchange with National Rail services there.  This would form part of a larger scheme to regenerate the area and create additional tourist attractions such as a proposed Heywood Culture Park.

The original station was situated immediately opposite the terminal wharf of the Heywood Branch Canal. The East Lancashire Railway station is situated slightly further to the east, nearer to the former Heywood railway wagon works.

References

Further reading
The Manchester and Leeds Railway by Martin Bairstow

External links

Transport & Travel on Road, Canal & Railway
The Castleton and Heywood Masterplan Study by Mouchel & Rochdale Metropolitan Borough Council to develop tourism potential of the two areas.

Heritage railway stations in the Metropolitan Borough of Rochdale
Former Lancashire and Yorkshire Railway stations
Railway stations in Great Britain opened in 1841
Railway stations in Great Britain closed in 1970
Heywood, Greater Manchester